Tatinec is a settlement north of Kranj in the Upper Carniola region of Slovenia.

References

External links

Tatinec on Geopedia

Populated places in the City Municipality of Kranj